Alfred Albert Joe de Re la Gardiur (July 25, 1881 – January 31, 1941), was a Luxembourgish-American professional wrestler.

Early life 
Alfred Albert Joe de Re la Gardiur was born in Diekirch on July 25, 1881, to a French Protestant father and a Belgian Catholic mother.

Professional wrestling career 
After travelling to England, South America and Australia, Gardiur arrived in New York City in 1900.  After a stint in the United States Navy, he was a United States Citizen by 1906. In 1921, he met shooter Cal Farley and made his home in Amarillo.

Gardiur, wrestled around the world, under the ringname Dutch Mantell, developing a reputation for being a vicious heel. During his later years he trained various wrestlers including Roy Welch.

Death 
Gardiur died from cancer at the Northwest Texas Hospital in Amarillo, Texas on January 31, 1941.

References 

1881 births
1941 deaths
20th-century professional wrestlers
Luxembourgish professional wrestlers